The play-offs of the 2016 Fed Cup Europe/Africa Zone Group II were the final stages of the Group II zonal competition involving teams from Europe and Africa. Using the positions determined in their pools, the seven teams faced off to determine their placing in the 2015 Fed Cup Europe/Africa Zone Group II. The top two teams advanced to Group I, and the bottom two teams were relegated down to the Group III for the next year.

Promotional play-offs 
The first-placed teams of each pool played against the second-placed teams of the other pool in head-to-head rounds. The winner of each round advanced to the 2017 Europe/Africa Zone Group I.

Denmark vs. Bosnia and Herzegovina

Lithuania vs. Austria

Relegation play-offs 
The third-placed teams of the pools played against each other in a head-to-head round. The loser of each round was relegated to the 2017 Europe/Africa Zone Group III.

Egypt vs. Finland

Final placements 

References

External links 
 Fed Cup website

2016 Fed Cup Europe/Africa Zone